David C. Korten (born 1937) is an American author, former professor of the Harvard Business School, political activist, prominent critic of corporate globalization, and "by training and inclination a student of psychology and behavioral systems". His best-known publication is When Corporations Rule the World (1995 and 2001). In 2011, he was named an Utne Reader visionary.

Early life and career
David Korten was born in Longview, Washington, in 1937 and is a 1955 graduate of its R. A. Long High School. He received a master of business administration and Ph.D. from the Stanford University Graduate School of Business. He said: "My early career [after leaving Stanford in 1959] was devoted to setting up business schools in low-income countries—starting with Ethiopia". He served during the Vietnam War as a captain in the United States Air Force, undertaking U.S.-based teaching and organizational duties; and for five and a half years was a visiting professor in the Harvard Business School. While at Stanford in the 1950s, he married Frances Fisher Korten, with whom he lives on Bainbridge Island near Seattle, Washington.

Career and main body of work

Korten served for five and a half years as a visiting associate professor of the Harvard University Graduate School of Business where he taught in Harvard's middle management, M.B.A., and doctoral programs.

He also served as the Harvard Business School adviser to the Nicaragua-based Central American Institute of Business Administration. He subsequently joined the staff of the Harvard Institute for International Development, where he headed a Ford Foundation-funded project to strengthen the organization and management of national family planning programs.

In the late 1970s, Korten moved to Southeast Asia, where he lived for nearly fifteen years, serving as a Ford Foundation project specialist and, later, as Asia regional adviser on development management to the United States Agency for International Development (USAID), which involved him in regular travels to Pakistan, India, Bangladesh, Sri Lanka, Thailand, Indonesia, and the Philippines.

Korten has written that he became disenchanted with the official aid system and devoted his last five years in Asia to "working with leaders of Asian non-governmental organizations on identifying the root causes of development failure in the region and building the capacity of civil society organizations to function as strategic catalysts of national- and global-level change". He formed the view that the poverty, growing inequality, environmental devastation, and social disintegration he was observing in Asia also was being experienced in nearly every country in the world, including the United States and other "developed" countries. He also concluded that the United States was actively promoting—both at home and abroad—the very policies that were deepening the resulting global crisis.

He returned to the U.S. in 1992 and has assisted in raising public consciousness of the political and institutional consequences of economic globalization and the expansion of corporate power at the expense of democracy, equity, and environmental protection.

Korten is co-founder and board chair of the Positive Futures Network, which publishes the quarterly YES! Magazine. He is also a founding board member, emeritus, of the Business Alliance for Local Living Economies, a former associate of the International Forum on Globalization, and a member of the Club of Rome.

The Post-Corporate World
Building on the arguments put forward in his 1995 book When Corporations Rule the World, Korten expands on several of the themes. Having made a case for the unworkability of current economic systems on several grounds - the impoverishment of the majority of the population, the need for indefinitely expanding credit leading to the debasement of the currency, and the finite limits of energy and material resources - he provides a context for discussing alternative ways of life, and explores possible courses of action to establish them.

The Great Turning

Korten's 2006 book The Great Turning: From Empire to Earth Community argues that the development of empires about 5,000 years ago initiated unequal distribution of power and social benefits to the small portion of the population that controlled them. He also argues that corporations are modern versions of empire, both being social organizations based on hierarchies, chauvinism, and domination through violence.

The rise of powerful advanced technology, combined with the control of corporate as well as nation-based empires is described as being increasingly destructive to communities and the environment. Korten postulates that the world is on the verge of a perfect storm of converging crises, including anthropogenic adverse climate change, post-peak oil production decline, and a financial crisis caused by an unbalanced global economy. This will precipitate major changes to the current economic and social structure.

Korten believes that these crises will present an opportunity for significant changes that could replace the paradigm of "Empire" with one of "Earth Community." Although recognizing the potential that the opportunity may not be seized, Korten hopes that this opportunity will result in the emergence of an "Earth Community," based on sustainable, just, and caring communities that incorporate the values of mutual responsibility and accountability, and he advocates toward that.

Bibliography
 Planned Change in a Traditional Society: Psychological Problems of Modernization in Ethiopia (1972), Praeger Publishers
 People-Centered Development: Contributions Toward Theory and Planning Frameworks (with Rudi Klauss, 1984), Kumarian Press
 Bureaucracy and the Poor: Closing the Gap (with Felipe B. Alfonso, 1985), Kumarian Press
 Community Management: Asian Experience and Perspectives (1986), Kumarian Press
 Getting to the 21st Century: Voluntary Action and the Global Agenda (1990), Kumarian Press
 The Post-Corporate World: Life After Capitalism (1999), Berrett-Koehler Publishers; .
 Alternatives to Economic Globalization: A Better World is Possible, 2nd Edition (2004)
 The Great Turning: From Empire to Earth Community (2007), Berrett-Koehler Publishers; .
 Agenda for a New Economy: From Phantom Wealth to Real Wealth, 2nd Edition (2010), Berrett-Koehler Publishers; .
 Globalizing Civil Society, 2010, ReadHowYouWant
 Change The Story, Change the Future: A Living Economy for a Living Earth (2015), Berrett-Koehler Publishers; . 
 When Corporations Rule the World (2015, 3rd Edition), Berrett-Koehler Publishers; .

See also
 Corporate libertarianism
 Earth Charter
 Spaceship Earth
 Joanna Macy, collaborator with Korten who uses "The Great Turning" idea in her work

References

External links

 
 Video of David Korten with the Dalai Lama during filming of the documentary Dalai Lama Renaissance
 "Conscious Choice - The End of Business as Usual" - 2007 article on Korten, his work, and an assessment of the significance of The Great Turning: From Empire to Earth Community
 "The Betrayal of Adam Smith" - article by David C. Korten
 "We Are Hard-Wired To Care and Connect" - article by David Korten, July 30, 2008, YES! Magazine
 "The Story of David Korten" - 2007 article by Our World in Balance
 "Everybody Wants To Rule The World - 2007 interview with David Korten on The Great Turning by Arnie Cooper in The Sun magazine
 "Development, Heresy and The Ecological Revolution: An open letter to the Industrialized world" - 1992 article by David C. Korten
 "What Can We Learn from the Antiglobalists?" - 2006 critique of Korten's perspective by author Mark Satin

1937 births
Living people
People from Longview, Washington
American business writers
Anti-corporate activists
American anti-globalization writers
American male non-fiction writers
American non-fiction environmental writers
American social sciences writers
Nautilus Book Award winners
Development specialists
Sustainability advocates
Environmental economists
Ecological economists
Anti-consumerists
Stanford Graduate School of Business alumni
United States Air Force officers
People of the United States Agency for International Development
Articles containing video clips
Harvard Institute for International Development